Naval Defence Act may refer to:

 Naval Defence Act 1889, an act of Parliament in the U.K.

See also 
 NDA (disambiguation)